WPY may refer to:
 White Pass and Yukon Route, American-Canadian railroad
 Wildlife Photographer of the Year, annual wildlife photography competition